Robby is a 1968 family film written and directed by Ralph C. Bluemke. It is a modern-day retelling of the Daniel Defoe novel Robinson Crusoe in which the main characters are portrayed as children. The film deals with many themes, including friendship, homesickness, racial blindness and naturism.

Plot
The film opens with a lifeboat washing up onto shore of a tropical island. Inside the lifeboat is nine-year-old Robby. Robby explores the island but finds no signs of any other humans. He falls into a lagoon and almost drowns, but is rescued by a naked black native boy, whom Robby befriends and names Friday. Robby questions Friday about his naked state and lack of shame, but it soon becomes quite clear that Friday does not understand English.

It is not long before Robby himself abandons his own clothes and the two friends scamper around the island naked and free without adult supervision. Robby teaches Friday how to speak English, and in turn Friday teaches Robby how to swim. Together, the two boys survive on the island, with only each other to rely on. They build a shelter and fish for sustenance. They are faced with threats of poisonous snakes and cannibals, of which they find evidence in the form of human remains, as well as a stranger who mysteriously appears on their island one night.

The stranger, who later introduces himself as Hank, wakes the boys up in the middle the night rambling in a drunken stupor to his imaginary friend Fitzgibbons. The boys, sleeping in the naked state to which they have become accustomed, leave their makeshift hut to investigate. Robby, thinking it might be his father come to rescue him, puts on his now tattered cutoff jean shorts. Friday sees no need to get dressed, believing the voices to belong to cannibals from a neighboring island. The boys arrive on the beach to find Hank passed out, and they drag him back to their hut.

The next day, Hank wakes up and investigates his surroundings. He finds Robby's t-shirt and tattered shorts strewn carelessly on the beach outside the hut, and he hears children laughing in the distance. He follows the sound of the laughter to the lagoon, where he discovers Robby and Friday spearfishing in the nude. Hank introduces himself to the boys, who in turn share their fish and show him around their island. The boys remain unclothed in the presence of their guest, but they are not the least bit embarrassed or ashamed to be seen naked by an adult, and Hank does not reprimand them for it. He even joins them skinny dipping in the ocean.

Robby asks Hank if he knows his father. Hank tells him he does not, but that he is familiar with his father's work, though it is quite clear he is hiding something. Hank later reveals that he read about Robby's father in the newspaper, that he and Robby's mother died at sea, and that Robby was the only one to survive the shipwreck. Robby and Friday get dressed and Hank takes them both home in his sailboat to live with Robby's rich aunt.

Back in civilization, Robby and Friday listen to a seashell which reminds them of the ocean, conjuring fond memories of running naked on the beach, playing Cowboys and Indians, and skinny dipping in the surf.

Cast
 Warren Raum as Robby
 Ryp Siani as Friday
 John Garces as Harton Crandall
 Rita Elliot as Janet Woodruff
 Ralph Bluemke as Chauffeur

Production
Writer/director Ralph C. Bluemke originally conceived the idea of retelling the classic Robinson Crusoe story with children as the principals while working at a bank in 1960, seven years before filming would even begin.

In choosing his principal actors, Bluemke first cast ten-year-old Ryp Siani in the role of Friday. Ryp was already a seasoned child actor by this time, having been brought up in a show business family, and appearing in television commercials since early childhood. Casting the role of Robby was more challenging. After looking at dozens of child actors, Bluemke finally settled on nine-year-old Warren Raum.  For the role, Warren's hair was bleached platinum blond in order to symbolize the innocence of youth, and also to further contrast Ryp's dark hair and complexion.

The film was shot on location on Vieques Island in Puerto Rico, the same island on which Lord of the Flies was shot five years earlier. Incidentally, both films are about children marooned on a desert island.

Nudity

Given the nature and location of the script, writer/director Ralph C. Bluemke knew from the beginning that the film would require a certain amount of nudity in order to give it a sense of realism and authenticity. Warren Raum (age 9) and Ryp Siani (age 10), who played Robby and Friday, respectively, were both Bluemke's first choices for the leading roles. Fortunately for him, both the child actors and their parents were okay with the nudity featured in the script.

When cinematographer Al Mozell asked Bluemke how far he wanted to go in showing the actors' naked bodies, Bluemke told him to simply film the boys as if they were fully clothed. Mozell reluctantly agreed, saying, "Okay, but nudity is a no-no."

Bluemke at the time was under the impression that the nudity depicted in the film would be condoned as natural and innocent, given the backdrop of the story, and given that the actors involved were prepubescent boys. At the time, it was much more acceptable to show child nudity than adult nudity in films, as it was considered wholesome and nonsexual. He cited Lord of the Flies as an example, a film which also depicted naked boys in a similar setting, some of whom were even older than Raum and Siani. However, Lord of the Flies depicted primarily incidental rear nudity, while Robby included lengthy shots of full frontal nudity of both boys. As a result, the film failed to attain a wide distribution deal, as prospective distributors were wary about the extensive nude scenes.

When it came time to remove his pants and underwear, it was soon revealed that Warren had a sharp tan line in the shape of his shorts that caused his buttocks and penis to be pale white in strong contrast to his otherwise bronzed complexion. Ryp's tan line, while present, was less noticeable due to his naturally darker complexion. Consequently, on the first day of shooting their nude scenes, both Warren and Ryp suffered severe sunburn to the buttocks, as these sensitive areas were not accustomed to long term exposure to the sun. As a result, filming had to be postponed briefly while the actors recovered. By the time filming ended, however, both boys had developed dark, full body tans.

Before filming began, none of the cast and crew were nudists. However, since many of their scenes were filmed naked, Warren Raum and Ryp Siani quickly took to the habit of being nude unless it was required for a particular scene. As a result, the rest of the cast and crew soon became accustomed to seeing the two boys wandering around the set stark naked, even when not filming. Much of the crew eventually joined in, occasionally skinny dipping with the actors during lunch breaks and downtime.

Reception

Release
The film failed to secure a wide distribution deal, in part because prospective distributors were wary about the extensive nudity featured in the film. Undaunted, the producers raised enough capital to release the film themselves, acting as their own distributor. It had limited screenings on Broadway in New York City in August 1968.

The film was released on VHS in 1983 by Award Films International. A Region Free DVD was also subsequently released, featuring bonus material including the film's original trailer, a behind-the-scenes photo gallery, press quotes, illustrated Robby book and making-of text by writer/director Ralph C. Bluemke. Both the VHS and DVD release versions feature a new score credited to composer Christopher Young, replacing the film's original score by John Randolph Eaton.

Critical response
Upon its initial release, Robby received widely positive reviews from critics. Bob Salmaggi, of WINS, New York, called the film "Enchanting!...a heartwarming masterpiece." Howard Thompson of The New York Times called it "a genteel little drama, purposeful in content, perceptive in tone." Com-Collegiate News called Robby "Among the best movies of the year!...a thoughtful, artistic parable that is both heartwarming and timeless."

In addition, both actors Raum and Siani received praise for their performances in the film. Variety said "Warren Raum as Robby and Ryp Siani as Friday could put precocious Hollywood child actors to shame!" Com-Collegiate News said "Robby is played very well by young Warren Raum, and Ryp Siani displays some of the best acting a child has ever done on the screen!" Bob Salmaggi called Warren Raum "a little charmer as Robby, and Ryp Siani...absolutely perfect as Friday."

Book adaptation
After the film's release, Robby was adapted into a children's book by writer/director Ralph C. Bluemke, illustrated with screenshots from the film. The entire text of the book, along with the illustrations, is included as a bonus feature on the DVD release from Award Films International.

See also
List of American films of 1968

References

External links

1968 films
American independent films
American coming-of-age films
Films scored by Christopher Young
Films shot in Puerto Rico
Nudity in film
1960s English-language films
1960s American films